A list of films produced in Argentina in 1946:

External links and references
 Argentine films of 1946 at the Internet Movie Database

1946
Films
Argentine